Hints is a small village and civil parish between Lichfield and Tamworth in southeastern Staffordshire, within Lichfield local government district. The village is on the line of Watling Street, which was formerly the A5, but the A5 now runs in a cutting north of the village. The name of the parish council is Hints with Canwell. The parish church is dedicated to St Bartholomew.

The name Hints appears to derive from the Welsh word hynt, meaning 'a road' (referring to Watling Street).  This suggests that the area was occupied by Welsh speakers until at least the late 6th century, when most of the Midlands had been occupied by the English. The centre of Hints is situated 200 metres north of Bourne Brook (aka Black Brook), a western tributary of the River Tame, and nearby villages include Hopwas, Weeford and Drayton Bassett

Nearby Twycross Zoo was founded in 1963 by pet shop owners Molly Badham and Natalie Evans, after the pair's increasing zoological collection outgrew their three-quarter-acre site in Hints, Staffordshire

Physician and author Sir John Floyer (1649–1734) was born in Hints.

References

External links

 Official church web site
 Village web site
 GENUKI: Hints

Villages in Staffordshire
Civil parishes in Staffordshire
Lichfield District